Trestin George (born August 24, 1983) is an American actor and former professional American football defensive back. He played for the BC Lions of the Canadian Football League until he requested his release to be closer to his family. He was signed as an undrafted free agent by the Jacksonville Jaguars in 2006. He played college football for the San Jose State Spartans.

Acting career
While a rookie for the Jacksonville Jaguars, a film company called Spring Street Studios filmed a documentary on George's life entitled the Trestin George Story.

In 2012, George joined the SAG-AFTRA union, and George made his major film debut in the movie Fruitvale Station.

References

External links
BC Lions bio
San Jose State Spartans bio

1983 births
Living people
American male film actors
American football defensive backs
Canadian football defensive backs
American players of Canadian football
San Jose State Spartans football players
African-American male actors
Jacksonville Jaguars players
San Jose SaberCats players
BC Lions players
21st-century African-American people
20th-century African-American people
Players of American football from Pasadena, California
Players of Canadian football from Pasadena, California